Besh-Badam is a village in Jalal-Abad Region of Kyrgyzstan. Its population was 1,720 in 2021. Formerly a village within the rural community (ayyl aymagy) of Bazar-Korgon, it was merged into the new city of Bazar-Korgon in January 2021.

The town of Karacha is 5 miles (8 km) to the southwest, and Kyzyl-Oktyabr is 5 miles (8 km) to the west.

References

External links 
 Satellite map at Maplandia.com

Populated places in Jalal-Abad Region